Bishan Stadium is a multi-purpose stadium in Bishan, Singapore. It is currently used mostly for football matches. The stadium was constructed in 1998 and is managed by Sport Singapore.

The public can use the facilities from 4:30 am to 8:30 pm daily unless it is exclusively booked for a sporting event. An indoor sports hall with facilities for badminton, table tennis and gymnastics lies adjacent to the stadium.

Location
Situated in the central part of Singapore, Bishan Stadium is part of the Bishan Sports and Recreation Centre, which includes the Bishan Sports Hall and the Bishan Swimming Complex.

History

Since its opening in 1998, Bishan Stadium has been the ground of Home United Football Club, a professional football club in Singapore. From 2004 to 2006, the Stadium was used for the team's home matches in the Asian Football Confederation Cup tournament.

The Australian national team also used the Stadium as its training base for two weeks in June 2007 before it left for the Asian Cup.

Transport

Mass Rapid Transit (MRT)
The stadium is located near Bishan MRT station on the North South line.

Bus
Buses 53, 410G/W arrives at the bus stop opposite at the stadium.

Events 
In September 2006, Bishan Stadium was one of two venues for the Asian Football Confederation U-17 championship hosted by Singapore.

Bishan Stadium was used as the athletics venue of the 2010 Summer Youth Olympics.

The Stadium was also the venue for the 35th Singapore Junior Athletics Championships 2009, which was held in May of that year.

In 2015, when Singapore hosted the 2015 Southeast Asian Games, it was the venue for the group stage matches of the football event.

In 2018, it hosted two international football matches on 7 and 11 September, with Singapore facing the national football teams of Mauritius and Fiji respectively.

In 2021, Bishan was one of the two venues to be used for the 2020 AFF Championship and hosted most of the matches in Group B.

See also
List of stadiums in Singapore

References

External links

Bishan Stadium (Facebook Page)

 

Buildings and structures in Bishan, Singapore
Football venues in Singapore
Multi-purpose stadiums in Singapore
Sports venues in Singapore
Venues of the 2010 Summer Youth Olympics
Lion City Sailors FC
Singapore Premier League venues
Tourist attractions in Central Region, Singapore
Sports venues completed in 1998
1998 establishments in Singapore
20th-century architecture in Singapore